The 1993 Chatham Cup was the 66th annual nationwide knockout football competition in New Zealand.

Up to the last 16 of the competition, the cup was run in three regions (northern, central, and southern), with an open draw from the quarter-finals on. National League teams received a bye until the third round (last 64). In all, 153 teams took part in the competition, which consisted of a preliminary round, five rounds proper, quarter-finals, semi-finals, and a final.

The 1993 final
Napier City Rovers won the league/cup double.

Results

Third round

* Won on penalties by Cashmere (5-4) and Red Sox (4-2)

Fourth round

* Won on penalties by Manurewa (6-5)

Fifth round

Quarter-finals

Semi-finals

Final

References

Rec.Sport.Soccer Statistics Foundation New Zealand 1993 page
UltimateNZSoccer website 1993 Chatham Cup page

Chatham Cup
Chatham Cup
Chatham Cup